USS Elsie III (SP-708) was a United States Navy patrol vessel in commission from 1917 to 1919 that saw service during World War I. After the completion of her U.S. Navy career, she was in commission in the United States Coast and Geodetic Survey as the survey launch USC&GS Elsie III from 1919 to 1944.

Construction and commissioning
Elsie III was built as a civilian motorboat of the same name in 1912 at Morris Heights in the Bronx, New York. The U.S. Navy purchased her from her owner in 1917 for World War I service as a patrol vessel. She was commissioned on 30 June 1917 as USS Elsie III (SP-708).

United States Navy service
Assigned to the 1st Naval District for section patrol duties and based at Boston, Massachusetts, Elsie III operated in the vicinity of Boston for the rest of World War I on patrol, despatch, guard, towing, and transport duties.

United States Coast and Geodetic Survey service
The U.S. Navy transferred Elsie III to the U.S. Coast and Geodetic Survey on 21 April 1919. Commissioned into the Survey as the survey launch USC&GS Elsie III, she served along the United States East Coast during her career with the Survey.

Between 4 September and 12 September 1935, Elsie III joined the Coast and Geodetic Survey launch USC&GS Marindin in helping with relief efforts in the Florida Keys following the passage of the violent 1935 Labor Day hurricane.

The Coast and Geodetic Survey retired Elsie III from service in 1944.

References

Department of the Navy: Navy History and Heritage Command: Online Library of Selected Images: Civilian Ships: USS Elsie III (SP-708), 1917-1919. Used to be the civilian motor boat Elsie III (Built 1912)
NavSource Online: Section Patrol Craft Photo Archive: USC&GS Elsie III ex-USS Elsie III (SP 708)
NOAA History: Tools of the Trade: Coast and Geodetic Survey Ships: Elsie III
NOAA History, A Science Odyssey: Hall of Honor: Lifesaving and the Protection of Property by the Coast and Geodetic Survey 1845-1907

Patrol vessels of the United States Navy
World War I patrol vessels of the United States
Ships of the United States Coast and Geodetic Survey
Ships built in Morris Heights, Bronx
1912 ships
Ships transferred from the United States Navy to the United States Coast and Geodetic Survey